This is a list of tallest freestanding structures in the world past and present. To be freestanding a structure must not be supported by guy wires, the sea or other types of support. It therefore does not include guyed masts, partially guyed towers and drilling platforms but does include towers, skyscrapers (pinnacle height) and chimneys.

Freestanding structures (past or present) over  

  indicates a structure that is no longer standing. 
 For all structures the pinnacle height is given, so the height of skyscrapers may be different from the values at List of tallest buildings in the world.

Timeline of world's tallest freestanding structures

See also 

 List of tallest structures by country
 List of tallest demolished freestanding structures
 List of tallest towers
 List of tallest chimneys
 List of tallest buildings and structures
 List of tallest freestanding steel structures
 List of cities with the most skyscrapers
 Lattice tower

References 

Freestanding
Lists of construction records